Saint-Puy is a commune in the Gers department in southwestern France.

Geography

Population

Notable people 
Saint-Puy was the home of the gentleman soldier Blaise de Monluc.

See also
Communes of the Gers department

References

Communes of Gers